Ercall may relate to a number of things in Shropshire, England:
Ercall Hill, a small hill to the north of the Wrekin near Wellington
High Ercall, a small village in Telford and Wrekin borough
Ercall Magna, a civil parish covering High Ercall and neighbouring places
Child's Ercall, a small village and civil parish located between Newport and Market Drayton